Stavridis is a Greek family name with the etymological meaning "son of Stavros." The genitive case form Stavridou (Σταυρίδου) or Stavridi (Σταυρίδη) is applied to female name bearers.
Notable people with this name include:
 Eleftherios Stavridis (1893–1966), Greek journalist and politician
 James G. Stavridis (born 1955), retired United States Navy admiral
 Nikos Stavridis (1910–1987), Greek actor in film and theater
 Vasilios Stavridis (1925–2016), Greek theologian and university teacher

References 

Greek-language surnames
Surnames